CTFC can refer to one of the following English football clubs:

 Camberley Town F.C.
 Carlton Town F.C.
 Carterton Town F.C., founded as, and now known once again as Carterton F.C.
 Chard Town F.C.
 Chatham Town F.C.
 Chatteris Town F.C.
 Cheltenham Town F.C.
 Chertsey Town F.C.
 Chippenham Town F.C.
 Cinderford Town F.C.
 Cirencester Town F.C.
 Clacton Town F.C.
 Clevedon Town F.C.
 Coalville Town F.C.
 Corby Town F.C.
 Cradley Town F.C.
 Crawley Town F.C.

It can also refer to a natural resources research centre in Catalonia: Forest Sciences Centre of Catalonia